Mathys Goosen (born 18 May 1996) is a Dutch swimmer. He competed in the men's 50 metre butterfly event at the 2017 World Aquatics Championships. In 2014, he represented Netherlands at the 2014 Summer Youth Olympics held in Nanjing, China and he won the bronze medal in the boys' 50 metre butterfly event.

References

External links
 

1996 births
Living people
Place of birth missing (living people)
Swimmers at the 2014 Summer Youth Olympics
Dutch male butterfly swimmers
20th-century Dutch people
21st-century Dutch people